The Queensland Railways BB18¼ class locomotive was a class of 4-6-2 steam locomotives operated by the Queensland Railways.

History
The first 35 BB18¼ class locomotives were built by the Vulcan Foundry in Newton-le-Willows, England in 1950/51. Per Queensland Railway's classification system they were designated the BB18¼ class, BB representing they had three driving axles, and the 18¼ the cylinder diameter in inches.

A further 20 built by Walkers Limited, Maryborough between 1955 and 1958. No. 1089 was the last steam engine placed into service on a mainline Australian railway. 

Their route availability was always the same as for the BB18¼ and C19. The extremities of that availability when they were introduced were (from Brisbane)  Roma, Wallan-garra, Merinda (near Bowen), plus branches Bundamba to 3 miles 8 chains (on loop to Redbank), Gowrie to Wyreema loop, Warwick to Thane (South-Western Line), Ipswich to Workshops Gate, South Brisbane to Lota, Kuraby and Corinda, Shorncliffe, Dayboro, Pinkenba, Kilcoy, Brooloo, Byellee (near Gladstone) to Monto and Selene, Bajool to Pt Alma, Rockhampton to Emerald, Dawson and Callide Valley Branches, Townsville to Charters Towers and Babinda, and Merinda to Collinsville. The route availability was extended by track and bridge strengthening- Merinda to Stuart (near Townsville, and Babinda to Cairns (1952), Emerald to Capella and Mackay to Outer Harbour (1956), Emerald to Bogantungan and Charters Towers to Torrens Creek (1957), and Torrens Creek to Hughenden (1958). They were attached to Mayne (Brisbane), Ipswich, Toowoomba, Maryborough, Rockhampton, Mackay and Townsville depots over the years (see J W Knowles, Queensland Railways Steam Locomotives 1900 - 1960, self published, 2002,  Appendix 6, p315, Line Standards).

They did the same work throughout their lives as the earlier B18 1/4, even at the beginning being seen on goods, mixed, suburban and long distance passenger trains. The only difference was that at the beginning, when they were brand new, and in best condition, they were preferred for the long distance passenger work.

Description
The BB18¼ class locomotive is a type of 4-6-2 steam locomotive operated by the Queensland Railways. They were an improved version of the B18¼ class.

Some modifications to the original design were suggested by Vulcan Foundry and subsequently adopted. A number of features, including the mounting of Westinghouse pump on the fireman’s side, stainless steel rather than brass boiler bands, SCOA-P coupled wheels (rather than having traditional solid spokes the SCOA-P spoke is hollow, with a 'U' shaped cross section and are considerably lighter than a conventional spoked wheel) pressed steel sand box and a larger tender giving an increased coal and water capacity.

Engines constructed by Walkers Limited used electricity for the light on the rear of the tender, for side lamps and to illuminate the motion. All were fitted with roller bearings and chime whistles. The Vulcan built engines were painted hawthorn green when introduced, the Walkers built examples in a brighter green.

Preservation
Six have been preserved:
1037 by the Mackay Heritage Railway
1072 by the Zig Zag Railway, Lithgow, New South Wales
1077 at the Waltzing Matilda Centre, Winton as no 1015.
1079 by Queensland Rail at the Workshops Rail Museum
1086 by the Mackay Heritage Railway
1089 by Queensland Rail at the Workshops Rail Museum

References

External links

Railway locomotives introduced in 1950
BB18
Vulcan Foundry locomotives
Walkers Limited locomotives
4-6-2 locomotives